Hudspeth is a former medieval village, now farm, located near Elsdon, Northumberland County, England.  Hudspeth was given by Richard de Umfraville to Hugh de Morwick when he married Richard's daughter, Sibilla, in 1221.

See also
Hudspeth County, Texas, county located in the U.S. state of Texas
National Register of Historic Places listings in Hudspeth County, Texas

References

Former villages